One True Love is a 2012 Philippine television drama romantic series broadcast by GMA Network. It premiered on the network's Telebabad line up from June 11, 2012 to October 5, 2012, replacing My Beloved.

Mega Manila ratings are provided by AGB Nielsen Philippines.

Series overview

Episodes

June 2012

July 2012

August 2012

September 2012

October 2012

References

Lists of Philippine drama television series episodes